"Take Me There" is a song by American quartet Blackstreet and singer Mya, featuring Bad Boy rappers Mase and Blinky Blink. It was written by Mase, Michael Foster, Madeline Nelson, Tamara Savage and Teddy Riley. Riley also produced the song. The song serves as the theme song for the animated feature film The Rugrats Movie and was released on November 30, 1998, as the lead and only single from the soundtrack. It also appeared on Blackstreet's third studio album, Finally.

"Take Me There" reached  1 in New Zealand for three weeks in January 1999 and achieved platinum status for selling over 10,000 copies there. In North America, the song peaked at No. 14 on the US Billboard Hot 100 and No. 21 on the Canadian RPM Top Singles chart. It also became a hit in several European nations, peaking at No. 7 in the United Kingdom, No. 9 in Ireland, and No. 22 in the Netherlands.

Background
Blackstreet initially became involved with The Rugrats Movie (1998) and its soundtrack after finding out that they were Nickelodeons favorite R&B group. Looking for other ways to tap into what was popular with children, Teddy Riley enlisted the help of Mýa and Mase. Riley explained, "It would appeal to the kids, and to get a more... broader audience of the kids, it would be great to have Mýa and Mase." This collaboration resulted in the song "Take Me There", which Riley produced, incorporating the Rugrats theme song. Backstage at the MTV Video Music Awards, Mýa talked about the collaboration, saying, "We knocked it out in one day. Kids came to the studio [to hear the song], and they were listening to the song and they were just singing right along, because [the song] rings a bell when you first hear it."

Composition
"Take Me There" is a pop-rap and R&B song with a soft melody. It runs for four minutes and four seconds. The full-length version, including the instrumental section, is five minutes and two seconds. It contains interpolations of the original Rugrats TV theme, which was composed by Mark Mothersbaugh (uncredited).

Music video
The music video premiered in October 1998. The video starts with cartoon character Angelica Pickles turning on the television to a clip of the Rugrats pulling the Reptar Wagon up a hill. The clip used appears to be the deleted scene "The Rugrats March". It takes place in a realistic live-action version of the Pickles' house, with Mýa and Blackstreet dancing through the house. Mýa is seen in Tommy Pickles's bedroom, the members of Blackstreet are seen in the kitchen, and Mase and Blinky Blink are seen driving the Reptar Wagon against a background of a scene from the film. As the video ends, Angelica turns the television off. The video premiered as a part of Blackstreet and Mýa's hosting of SNICK, and was directed by Luke Nola and Steve Saussey.

Reception
The single entered the US Billboard Hot 100 chart on December 5, 1998, peaking at No. 14 on January 23, 1999. It reached No. 10 on Billboards Hot R&B/Hip Hop Songs chart. Internationally, it reached the top 10 in Ireland and the United Kingdom, and the top 20 in Japan. It also reached the top spot in New Zealand and was certified platinum by the Recording Industry Association of New Zealand. In 2014, Billboard ranked "Take Me There" in its "Top 50 Forgotten Gems From the Now! Series", which list songs from the series that were underrated at the time of their release.

Chart performance
The Rugrats Movie soundtrack was awarded a platinum certification in the United States for selling over one million copies. While the film's website credits sales to the strength of the major-label artists who participated, chart positions and sales correlate directly to the heavy promotions for the feature film's November 20, 1998, US release.

"Take Me There (Want U Back Mix)," which interpolates "I Want You Back" by the Jackson 5, peaked at No. 27 on the Billboard Hot 100 on December 19, 1998, after three weeks on the chart. That same day it made its way onto the top 40. During the week of December 7, 1998, "Take Me There" peaked at No. 13 on the Hits of the World board in the United Kingdom. The song landed on No. 19 of the Video Monitor, the most-played clips as monitored by the Broadcast Data Systems, via its airtime on BET. It also did very well on the MTV playlists, peaking at No. 21 in the same week. It was also well liked in The Clip List, making its debut on the Box Tops, and was played about 15 hours weekly on the California Music Channel (CMC).

Sound Tracks noted its popularity: The movie's success helped the soundtrack stay at No. 20 on the Billboard 200 chart for five weeks.

Remixes
One remix appears on Blackstreet's album Finally. This version omitted Mase and Blinky Blink, possibly because their verses primarily revolve around the Rugrats characters. It also appeared on The Rugrats Movie Soundtrack, which sampled the Jackson 5's number-one hit "I Want You Back", but it is not used in the film. It is available on the consumer CD version, which was issued in the United Kingdom in March 1999. A second remix, "Take Me There (Thugrats Remix)" appears on the "Girlfriend/Boyfriend" single featuring new verses from Mase and Blinky Blink.

Track listing
 "Take Me There" (radio version) – 4:01
 "Take Me There" (Want U Back mix) – 4:00
 "Take Me There" (album version) – 5:04
 "Take Me There" (instrumental) – 5:01

Charts

Weekly charts

Year-end charts

Certifications

Release history

See also
 List of UK top 10 singles in 1998
 List of number-one singles from the 1990s (New Zealand)

References

External links

 music video at vodpod  
 http://www.rugratonline.com/rrmovi2c.htm
 http://www.tv.com/sister-sister/freaknik/episode/59858/summary.html?tag=ep_guide;summary

1998 singles
1998 songs
1999 singles
Blackstreet songs
Interscope Records singles
Mase songs
Mýa songs
Number-one singles in New Zealand
Song recordings produced by Teddy Riley
Songs written by Mase
Songs written by Tamara Savage
Songs written by Teddy Riley
Songs written for films